The Seine at Bougival is an 1876 painting by Alfred Sisley, now in the Impressionist section of the Metropolitan Museum of Art, which acquired it in 1992 as a promised and partial gift of Mr and Mrs Douglas Dillon. It shows part of the Seine near Bougival.

References

1876 paintings
Paintings by Alfred Sisley
Paintings in the collection of the Metropolitan Museum of Art
Water in art